Cristián Fernando Suárez Figueroa (born February 6, 1987), is a Chilean football defender who currently plays for Palestino.

Club career
Born in San Felipe, before moving to Corinthians in December 2007, he played for Unión San Felipe. He played three official matches, and one friendly, against CENE, for Corinthians. Cristián Suárez joined Chacarita Juniors of Argentina on July 31, 2008.

International career
Suárez played the 2007 South American Youth Championship, helping Chile qualify to the 2007 FIFA U-20 World Cup where he also participated, and was called up for a match between the Chile and Argentina senior national teams. He was also called up to the senior Chile squad for a friendly against the United States in January 2015.

Honors

Club
Universidad de Chile
 Primera División de Chile (1): 2014 Apertura
 Supercopa de Chile (1): 2015
 Copa Chile (1): 2015

International
  Chile
FIFA U-20 World Cup:
Third place: 2007

References

Enternal links
 

1987 births
Living people
People from San Felipe, Chile
Chilean footballers
Chile under-20 international footballers
Chilean expatriate footballers
Unión San Felipe footballers
Sport Club Corinthians Paulista players
Chacarita Juniors footballers
O'Higgins F.C. footballers
S.C. Olhanense players
Cobreloa footballers
Universidad de Chile footballers
Everton de Viña del Mar footballers
Club Deportivo Palestino footballers
Primera B de Chile players
Chilean Primera División players
Campeonato Brasileiro Série B players
Primera Nacional players
Primeira Liga players
Chilean expatriate sportspeople in Brazil
Chilean expatriate sportspeople in Argentina
Chilean expatriate sportspeople in Portugal
Expatriate footballers in Brazil
Expatriate footballers in Argentina
Expatriate footballers in Portugal
Association football defenders